Monandrocarpa is a genus of ascidian tunicates in the family Styelidae.

Species within the genus Monandrocarpa include:
 Monandrocarpa abyssa Sanamyan & Sanamyan, 1999 
 Monandrocarpa humilis F. Monniot, 2009 
 Monandrocarpa incubita (Sluiter, 1904) 
 Monandrocarpa monotestis (Tokioka, 1953) 
 Monandrocarpa plana (Kott, 1972) 
 Monandrocarpa simplicigona (Millar, 1975) 
 Monandrocarpa stolonifera Monniot, 1970 
 Monandrocarpa tarona C. & F. Monniot, 1987 
 Monandrocarpa tritonis Michaelsen, 1904

References

Stolidobranchia
Tunicate genera